Vulcan's Throne is a cinder cone volcano and a prominent landmark on the North Rim of the Grand Canyon in Arizona, United States. The volcano is adjacent the Colorado River, (thousands of feet above the river) as it is the source material for Lava Falls and Lava Falls Rapids (Vulcan Rapids) one of the largest rapids of the Colorado. Vulcan's Throne, about a mile (1.7 km) west of Toroweap overlook, is part of the Uinkaret volcanic field. The journals of traveler George Corning Fraser record a trip to the summit of Vulcan's Throne in 1914. At the time, the surrounding area was used for sheep grazing, and a small reservoir had been constructed at the base of the volcano.  Fraser wrote that

The cinder cone was formed during the Quaternary Period, and is cut by recent movement on the Toroweap Fault.

The damming of the Colorado River by the lava from Vulcan’s Throne, created a major rapids. The Lava Falls Rapids are so large that they can be heard on certain days, from the adjacent overlook of Toroweap Point.

Lava Falls Rapids

See also
 List of volcanoes in the United States

References

External links
 
 

Volcanoes of Arizona
Mountains of Arizona
Cinder cones of the United States
Grand Canyon, North Rim
Pleistocene volcanoes
Landforms of Mohave County, Arizona
Mountains of Mohave County, Arizona
Grand Canyon, North Rim (west)